Varieties of the color blue may differ in hue, chroma (also called saturation, intensity, or colorfulness), or lightness (or value, tone, or brightness), or in two or three of these qualities. Variations in value are also called tints and shades, a tint being a blue or other hue mixed with white, a shade being mixed with black. A large selection of these colors are shown below.

Definitions of blue

Blue (RGB) (X11 blue)

The color defined as blue in the RGB color model, X11 blue, is shown at right. This color is the brightest possible blue that can be reproduced on a computer screen, and is the color named blue in X11. It is one of the three primary colors used in the RGB color space, along with red and green. The three additive primaries in the RGB color system are the three colors of light chosen such as to provide the maximum gamut of colors that are capable of being represented on a computer or television set.

This color is also called color wheel blue. It is at 240 degrees on the HSV color wheel, also known as the RGB color wheel. It is a spectral color which lies at, or near, the short-wave (violet) end of the traditional "blue" and possibly was classified as "indigo" by Newton. Its complementary color is yellow.

Blue (CMYK) (pigment blue)

The color defined as blue in the CMYK color system used in printing, also known as pigment blue, is the tone of blue that is achieved by mixing process (printer's) cyan and process (printer's) magenta in equal proportions.

The purpose of the CMYK color system is to provide the maximum possible gamut of color reproducible in printing by the use of only three primaries.

The color indicated is only approximate as the colors of printing inks may vary.

Blue (Pantone)

Blue (Pantone) is the color that is called blue in Pantone.

The source of this color is the "Pantone Textile Paper eXtended (TPX)" color list, color # Blue C, EC, HC, M, PC, U, or UP—Blue.

Blue (NCS) (psychological primary blue)

The color defined as blue in the NCS or Natural Color System is an azure-like color shown at right (NCS 2060-B). The Natural Color System is a color system based on the four unique hues or psychological primary colors red, yellow, green, and blue. The NCS is based on the opponent process theory of vision.

The “Natural Color System” is widely used in Scandinavia.

NCS Blue can only be displayed approximately on a computer screen, as these spectral colors have been adjusted to fit into the sRGB gamut. In the 21st century, this hue is classified as an variation of azure that is on the border of cyan.

Blue (Munsell)

The color defined as blue in the Munsell color system (Munsell 5B) is shown at right. The Munsell color system is a color space that specifies colors based on three color dimensions: hue, value (lightness), and chroma (color purity), spaced uniformly (according to the logarithmic scale which governs human perception) in three dimensions in the Munsell color solid, which is shaped like an elongated oval at an angle. In order for all the colors to be spaced uniformly, it was found necessary to use a color wheel with five primary colors: red, yellow, green, blue, and purple.

Munsell can only be displayed approximately on a computer screen, as these spectral colors have been adjusted to fit into the sRGB gamut. In the 21st century, this hue is classified as an intermediate between azure and cyan.

Blue (Crayola)

Blue (Crayola) is the color called blue in Crayola crayons.

"Blue" was one of the original Crayola crayons formulated in 1903.

Crayola can only be displayed approximately on a computer screen. In the 21st century, this hue is classified as an variation of azure that is on the border of blue.

Tints, shades, and variations of blue
The term tint and shade is used in its technical sense as used in color theory.

In this section, the term 'tint' usually refers to  a blueish color mixed with white or light gray. The term shade is used in its technical sense as used in color theory, meaning a blueish color mixed with black or dark gray.

The colors arranged in order of their value (brightness) (V in the HSV code), the brighter colors toward the top and the darker colors toward the bottom.

Periwinkle

Periwinkle (also periwinkle blue or lavender blue) is a mixture of white, blue, and red. It is named after the Periwinkle flower and is also commonly referred to as a tone of light blue.

Ultramarine

Ultramarine is a blue pigment in use since medieval times. It was originally derived from lapis lazuli, a bright blue mineral.

Medium blue

The web color medium blue is a shade of the standard (h = 240°) blue.

Savoy blue

Savoy blue, or savoy azure, is a shade of saturation blue between peacock blue and periwinkle, lighter than peacock blue. It owes its name to its being the color of the House of Savoy, a ruling dynasty in Italy from 1861 to 1946.

Having become a national color with the unification of Italy (1861), its use continued even after the birth of the Italian Republic (1946) with the name "Italian blue". An Italian-blue border was inserted on the edge of the Presidential Standard of Italy and the use of the blue scarf for the Italian Armed Forces' officers, for the presidents of the Italian provinces during the official ceremonies and of the blue jersey for Italian national sports teams it was also maintained in the Republican era.

Liberty 

Liberty is a strong blue color.

The first recorded use of liberty as a color name in English was in 1918.

Egyptian blue

Egyptian blue is a pigment that was used in Ancient Egypt.

Neon blue

Neon blue is a vivid purplish blue.

Dark blue

Dark blue is a shade of the standard (h = 240°) blue.

Picotee blue

Picotee blue represents the color of the picotee flower. It is a deep shade of indigo, almost resembling St. Patrick's Blue.

Bluebonnet 

Bluebonnet is a bright shade of blue with a slight violet tinge. It represents the color of bluebonnet flowers, which are part of the lupin family. The bluebonnet is the state flower of Texas.

Navy blue

Navy blue is a shade of the standard (h = 240°) blue. Navy blue got its name from the dark blue (contrasted with white) worn by sailors in the Royal Navy since 1748 (originally called marine blue before 1840) and subsequently adopted by other navies around the world.

The first recorded use of navy blue as a color name in English was in 1840.

Midnight blue

Midnight blue is an X11 web color. This color was originally called midnight.  The first recorded use of midnight as a color name in English was in 1915.

Independence

Independence is a dark blue color.

The first recorded use of independence as a color name in English was in 1927.

Space cadet

Space cadet is one of the colors on the Resene Color List, a color list popular in Australia and New Zealand. The color "space cadet" was formulated in 2007.

Twin bed

Twin Bed is so named since its HEX color code spells out "BED" twice.  The color is also recognized for bearing very close semblance to that of many commonly-used bed sheets.

International Klein Blue 

International Klein Blue (IKB) is a deep blue hue first mixed by the French artist Yves Klein. IKB's visual impact comes from its heavy reliance on ultramarine, as well as Klein's often thick and textured application of paint to canvas. There is a legend that Klein patented the color, but in reality he simply submitted a Soleau envelope and never progressed to the patent stage.

Blurple (2015-2021) 

Original Blurple is a brilliant purplish blue hue. It is the older version of Blurple, described below. It was used in the old Discord logo. Before 13 May 2021, it was simply called Blurple.

Blurple (2021-Present) 

Blurple is a vivid purplish blue hue. It is used in the new Discord logo.

Cool black

Cool black is a dark shade of blue. It is one of Pantone colors.

Ambiguous variations of blue

In this section, shades fall outside the tertiary color range for blue, and many can be considered variations of cyan and azure, rather than blue.

Baby blue

Baby blue is known as one of the pastel colors.

The first recorded use of baby blue as a color name in English was in 1892.

Light blue

The web color light blue is part of the X11 color system, with a hue code of 194. Variations of this color are known as sky blue, baby blue, or angel blue.

The first recorded use of "light blue" as a color term in English is in 1915.

Powder blue

Powder blue is a light bluish green.

The first recorded use of powder blue as a color name in English was in 1774. It is a web color.

Uranian blue

Uranian blue is a light greenish blue, the color of Uranus.

Argentinian blue

The web color Argentinian blue is a light azure color seen on the national flag of Argentina.

Ruddy blue

Ruddy blue represents the coloring of the beak of the ruddy duck.

Celtic blue 

Celtic blue is a shade of blue, also known as glas celtig in Welsh, or gorm ceilteach in both the Irish language and in Scottish Gaelic. Julius Caesar reported (in Commentarii de Bello Gallico) that the Britanni used to colour their bodies blue with vitrum, a word that means primarily "glass", but also the domestic name for the "woad" (Isatis tinctoria), besides the Gaulish loanword glastum (from Proto-Celtic *glastos "green"). The connection seems to be that both glass and the woad are "water-like" (lat. vitrum is from Proto-Indo-European *wed-ro- "water-like").

Spanish blue

Spanish blue is the color that is called Azul (the Spanish word for "blue") in the Guía de coloraciones (Guide to colorations) by Rosa Gallego and Juan Carlos Sanz, a color dictionary published in 2005 that is widely popular in the Hispanophone realm.

Bleu de France

Bleu de France is a vivid blue color that has been associated in heraldry with the Kings of France since the 12th century.

Delft blue

Delft blue is a dark blue color.

The name is derived from the Dutch pottery Delftware, also known simply as "Delft Blue".

Duck blue

Duck blue is a moderate greenish blue.

Resolution blue

Resolution blue is a vivid blue color.

This color name first came into use in 2001 when it was formulated as one of the colors on the Xona.com Color List.

Polynesian blue

Polynesian blue is a dark blue color, almost navy.

Moroccan Blue

Moroccan blue (also Chefchaouen blue) is a vivid blue color.

Sapphire 

Sapphire is a deep shade of navy blue, based on the color of an average sapphire gemstone. However, sapphires can also be pink, yellow, or orange.

Fluorescent blue

Fluorescent blue is a shade of blue that is radiant based on fluorescence. This is the main color on the Indian 50-rupee note.

Teal blue

Teal blue is a medium tone of teal with more blue.

The first recorded use of teal blue as a color name in English was in 1927.

See also 
Lists of colors
Azure (color)
Cyan

References